John Peter Novembre (born ) is a computational biologist at the University of Chicago. He received a MacArthur Fellowship in 2015. Novembre has developed data visualization and analysis techniques to investigate correlations between genomic diversity, geography, and demographic structure.

Education 
Novembre completed his undergraduate education in biochemistry at Colorado College in 2000. He then received a PhD in population genetics in 2006 at UC Berkeley; he was supervised by Montgomery Slatkin. He then went on to do postdoctoral research with Matthew Stephens in Chicago. In 2008, Novembre joined the Department of Ecology and Evolutionary Biology at the University of California, Los Angeles.

References

Computational biology
21st-century American biologists
MacArthur Fellows
Living people
1970s births
Year of birth uncertain